Liaison is a British-French thriller television series written by Virginie Brac, directed by Stephen Hopkins and starring Vincent Cassel and Eva Green. It premiered on 24 February 2023 on Apple TV+.

Synopsis 
A thriller following French spies and terrorists.

Cast
Vincent Cassel – Gabriel Delage
Eva Green – Alison Rowdy
Peter Mullan – Richard Banks
Gérard Lanvin – Dumas
Daniel Francis – Albert Onwori
Stanislas Merhar – Didier Taraud
Irène Jacob – Sophie Saint-Roch
Laëtitia Eïdo – Sabine Louseau
Eriq Ebouaney – Bob Foret
Bukky Bakray – Kim
Aziz Dyab – Samir
Marco Horanieh – Walid 
Lyna Dubarry – Myriam
Thierry Frémont – French President

Episodes

Production

Development
In June 2021, it was announced that Apple TV+ had greenlit Liaison, marking the platform's first "Anglo-French" production. Stephen Hopkins is directing, Virginie Brac is writing, and Gub Neal and Jean Benoit Gillig are executive producing. Additional executive producers include Hopkins, Sarada McDermott, Justin Thomson, and Ed Barlow, with Joanie Blaikie and Eric Jollant producing. It is co-produced by Ringside Studios and Léonis Productions.

Casting
It was announced alongside the main series announcement in June 2021 that Vincent Cassel and Eva Green would star. Also cast were British actors Peter Mullan, Daniel Francis, and Bukky Bakray and French actors Gérard Lanvin, Stanislas Merhar, Philippine Leroy-Beaulieu, Laëtitia Eïdo, Eriq Ebouaney and Thierry Frémont.

Filming
Principal photography began in London in June 2021. Filming was expected to conclude in October.

Response
New York Times: ‘Liaison’: Vincent Cassel and Eva Green Simmer as Global Tensions Boil 

Wall Street Journal: ‘Liaison’ Review: A Spy Thriller in Brexit’s Shadow

References

External links

2023 British television series debuts
2023 French television series debuts
2020s British drama television series
2020s French drama television series
Apple TV+ original programming
English-language television shows
French-language television shows
Television shows set in London
Television shows set in Paris